Early Soundtrack Sketches, Vol. II is the third studio album by Daniel Vahnke, released on August 1, 2018, by Rodentia Productions.

Track listing

Personnel
Adapted from the Early Soundtrack Sketches, Vol. II liner notes.

Axon Tremolo
 Daniel Vahnke – synthesizers, piano (15-18), sampler (4, 26)

Production
 Neil Wojewodzki – mastering, editing

Release history

References

External links 
 Early Soundtrack Sketches, Vol. II at Discogs (list of releases)
 Early Soundtrack Sketches, Vol. II at Bandcamp
 Early Soundtrack Sketches, Vol. II at iTunes

2018 albums
Daniel Vahnke albums